This glossary contains terms used in sewing, tailoring and related crafts. For terms used in the creation or manufacturing of textiles, including spinning, knitting, weaving, and individual fabrics and finishing processes, see Glossary of textile manufacturing.  For terms used in dyeing, see Glossary of dyeing terms.

Sewing is the craft of fastening or attaching objects using stitches made with needle and thread.  Sewing is one of the oldest of the textile arts, arising in the Paleolithic Era.  Although usually associated with clothing and household linens, sewing is used in a variety of crafts and industries, including shoemaking, upholstery, sailmaking, bookbinding and the manufacturing of some kinds of sporting goods.  Sewing is the fundamental process underlying a variety of textile arts and crafts, including embroidery, tapestry, quilting, appliqué and patchwork.

A

B

C

D

E

F

G

H

I

J

L

M

N

O

P

Q

R

S

T

W

Y

See also
 List of sewing machine brands

References

Citations

Bibliography

Further reading

 

Sewing
Sewing
Sewing terms
Wikipedia glossaries using description lists